The list of ship decommissionings in 1949 includes a chronological list of all ships decommissioned in 1949.


See also 

1949
 Ship decommissionings
Ship